Rewound may refer to:
Atlanta Rewound
Birmingham Rewound
Huntsville Rewound

See also
Rewind (disambiguation)